ILE can refer to:
 Intermittent Layer Extrusion, a process which allows the extrusion of a variable layer thickness tube (see 2 1/2D)
 Institution of Lighting Engineers, (ILE) UK and Ireland's largest professional lighting association
 Ivor Lewis Esophagectomy, a surgical procedure. See Esophagectomy.
 Institución Libre de Enseñanza, a Spanish education organization associated with Residencia de Estudiantes
 Intuitive Logical Extrovert, a Socionics term
 Skylark Field, Killeen, Texas, IATA airport code
 Indefinite life extension, the hypothetical elimination of aging via medicine
 Integrated Language Environment, a programming language model developed by IBM for OS/400 (now known as IBM i)
 Intermediate Level Education, at United States Army Command and General Staff College
 iLe, a Puerto Rican singer

See also 
 Ile (disambiguation)